Gaspard Laurent Bayle (18 August 1774, Le Vernet, Alpes-de-Haute-Provence – 1816) was a French physician.

He studied medicine under Jean-Nicolas Corvisart (1755–1821), and was a colleague to René Laennec (1781–1826). Beginning in 1805 he practiced medicine at the Hôpital de la Charité in Paris. He was an uncle to physician Antoine Laurent Bayle (1799–1859).

Bayle is remembered for his extensive work in pathological anatomy, making contributions in research of cancer and tuberculosis. As the result of 900 post-mortem investigations, he described six different types of tuberculosis — ulcerous phthisis, calculous phthisis, cancerous phthisis, tubercular phthisis, glandular phthisis and phthisis with melanosis.

His best known written effort was the 1810 Recherches sur la phthisie pulmonaire (Research of pulmonary tuberculosis). He also penned a treatise on cancerous diseases that was published posthumously (1833) by his nephew, Antoine Laurent Bayle.

References 
 Heirs of Hippocrates Gaspard Laurent Bayle
  (French biography on Gaspard Laurent Bayle, translated by Google)

1774 births
1816 deaths
People from Alpes-de-Haute-Provence
French pathologists
19th-century French physicians
18th-century French physicians